Évariste Boshab Mabudj-ma-Bilenge (born 12 January 1956) is a Congolese politician who is currently Deputy Prime Minister in Charge of the Interior and Security and a former President of the National Assembly.

Early life 
Boshab was born near Mweka, in the Democratic Republic of the Congo.

Career 
He was President of the National Assembly from 2009 to 2012.

See also 

 Christophe Mboso N'Kodia Pwanga
 Jeannine Mabunda
 Gabriel Kyungu wa Kumwanza

References

1956 births
Living people
People from Kasaï Province
Presidents of the National Assembly (Democratic Republic of the Congo)
Government ministers of the Democratic Republic of the Congo
People's Party for Reconstruction and Democracy politicians